The 2005–06 Montreal Canadiens season was the team's 97th season, 89th in the National Hockey League. The Canadiens would qualify for the playoffs, eventually being eliminated in the Eastern Conference Quarterfinals by the Carolina Hurricanes 4 games to 2.

Offseason

Regular season
Claude Julien started the season as coach but was fired and replaced on an interim basis by manager Bob Gainey. The Canadiens's number one goaltender Jose Theodore was traded to the Colorado Avalanche. His place was taken by Cristobal Huet. Huet would lead the league in save percentage of 92.9% and placed fourth overall in goals against average of 2.20.

Final standings

Playoffs
The Canadiens placed 3rd in the Northeast division, and seventh in the Eastern Conference. The Canadiens played the eventual Stanley Cup champion Carolina Hurricanes in the first round and lost four games to two. The Canadiens were winning 2–0 in the series when Saku Koivu sustained a serious injury to his left eye. Hurricanes forward Justin Williams attempted to lift Koivu's stick but instead struck him in the eye. Koivu was rushed to the hospital, where he would remain overnight and for the remainder of the playoffs. Koivu remained out of the lineup for the rest of the series and underwent surgery to repair a detached retina during the off-season.

Schedule and results

Regular season

|- align="center" bgcolor="#CCFFCC" 
|1||W||October 5, 2005||2–1 || align="left"| @ Boston Bruins (2005–06) ||1–0–0 || 
|- align="center" bgcolor="#CCFFCC" 
|2||W||October 6, 2005||4–3 OT || align="left"| @ New York Rangers (2005–06) ||2–0–0 || 
|- align="center" bgcolor="#CCFFCC" 
|3||W||October 8, 2005||5–4 || align="left"| @ Toronto Maple Leafs (2005–06) ||3–0–0 || 
|- align="center" bgcolor="#FFBBBB"
|4||L||October 11, 2005||2–4 || align="left"|  Ottawa Senators (2005–06) ||3–1–0 || 
|- align="center" bgcolor="#CCFFCC" 
|5||W||October 12, 2005||2–0 || align="left"| @ Atlanta Thrashers (2005–06) ||4–1–0 || 
|- align="center" bgcolor="#FFBBBB"
|6||L||October 15, 2005||2–3 || align="left"|  Toronto Maple Leafs (2005–06) ||4–2–0 || 
|- align="center" bgcolor="#CCFFCC" 
|7||W||October 18, 2005||4–3 || align="left"|  Boston Bruins (2005–06) ||5–2–0 || 
|- align="center" bgcolor="#CCFFCC" 
|8||W||October 22, 2005||4–3 || align="left"|  New York Islanders (2005–06) ||6–2–0 || 
|- align="center" bgcolor="#CCFFCC" 
|9||W||October 25, 2005||3–2 OT|| align="left"|  Philadelphia Flyers (2005–06) ||7–2–0 || 
|- align="center" 
|10||L||October 27, 2005||3–4 OT|| align="left"| @ Ottawa Senators (2005–06) ||7–2–1 || 
|- align="center" bgcolor="#FFBBBB"
|11||L||October 29, 2005||2–5 || align="left"|  New York Rangers (2005–06) ||7–3–1 || 
|- align="center" bgcolor="#CCFFCC" 
|12||W||October 31, 2005||4–1 || align="left"| @ New York Rangers (2005–06) ||8–3–1 || 
|-

|- align="center" bgcolor="#CCFFCC" 
|13||W||November 1, 2005||5–4 OT|| align="left"|  Florida Panthers (2005–06) ||9–3–1 || 
|- align="center" bgcolor="#CCFFCC" 
|14||W||November 4, 2005||3–2 || align="left"| @ Buffalo Sabres (2005–06) ||10–3–1 || 
|- align="center" bgcolor="#CCFFCC" 
|15||W||November 5, 2005||3–2 || align="left"|  Buffalo Sabres (2005–06) ||11–3–1 || 
|- align="center" bgcolor="#CCFFCC" 
|16||W||November 8, 2005||3–2 || align="left"|  Tampa Bay Lightning (2005–06) ||12–3–1 || 
|- align="center" 
|17||L||November 10, 2005||2–3 SO|| align="left"| @ Pittsburgh Penguins (2005–06) ||12–3–2 || 
|- align="center" 
|18||L||November 12, 2005||4–5 OT|| align="left"|  Toronto Maple Leafs (2005–06) ||12–3–3 || 
|- align="center" bgcolor="#CCFFCC" 
|19||W||November 15, 2005||4–3 OT|| align="left"|  Florida Panthers (2005–06) ||13–3–3 || 
|- align="center" bgcolor="#FFBBBB"
|20||L||November 18, 2005||3–5 || align="left"| @ New Jersey Devils (2005–06) ||13–4–3 || 
|- align="center" bgcolor="#FFBBBB"
|21||L||November 19, 2005||1–5 || align="left"|  Washington Capitals (2005–06) ||13–5–3 || 
|- align="center" bgcolor="#CCFFCC" 
|22||W||November 22, 2005||3–2 SO|| align="left"|  Atlanta Thrashers (2005–06) ||14–5–3 || 
|- align="center" bgcolor="#FFBBBB"
|23||L||November 25, 2005||1–3 || align="left"| @ Buffalo Sabres (2005–06) ||14–6–3 || 
|- align="center" 
|24||L||November 26, 2005||3–4 OT|| align="left"| @ Toronto Maple Leafs (2005–06) ||14–6–4 || 
|- align="center" bgcolor="#FFBBBB"
|25||L||November 29, 2005||0–4 || align="left"| @ Ottawa Senators (2005–06) ||14–7–4 || 
|-

|- align="center" 
|26||L||December 1, 2005||2–3 OT|| align="left"|  Buffalo Sabres (2005–06) ||14–7–5 || 
|- align="center" bgcolor="#CCFFCC" 
|27||W||December 3, 2005||3–2 || align="left"|  Los Angeles Kings (2005–06) ||15–7–5 || 
|- align="center" bgcolor="#FFBBBB"
|28||L||December 10, 2005||3–5 || align="left"|  Mighty Ducks of Anaheim (2005–06) ||15–8–5 || 
|- align="center" bgcolor="#CCFFCC" 
|29||W||December 13, 2005||5–2 || align="left"|  Phoenix Coyotes (2005–06) ||16–8–5 || 
|- align="center" bgcolor="#FFBBBB"
|30||L||December 15, 2005||3–5 || align="left"| @ Edmonton Oilers (2005–06) ||16–9–5 || 
|- align="center" 
|31||L||December 17, 2005||3–4 OT|| align="left"| @ Minnesota Wild (2005–06) ||16–9–6 || 
|- align="center" bgcolor="#CCFFCC" 
|32||W||December 20, 2005||4–3 SO|| align="left"|  Ottawa Senators (2005–06) ||17–9–6 || 
|- align="center" bgcolor="#FFBBBB"
|33||L||December 23, 2005||2–4 || align="left"| @ Washington Capitals (2005–06) ||17–10–6 || 
|- align="center" bgcolor="#FFBBBB"
|34||L||December 26, 2005||0–4 || align="left"| @ Atlanta Thrashers (2005–06) ||17–11–6 || 
|- align="center" bgcolor="#CCFFCC" 
|35||W||December 28, 2005||4–3 || align="left"| @ Tampa Bay Lightning (2005–06) ||18–11–6 || 
|- align="center" bgcolor="#FFBBBB"
|36||L||December 30, 2005||1–2 || align="left"| @ Florida Panthers (2005–06) ||18–12–6 || 
|- align="center" bgcolor="#FFBBBB"
|37||L||December 31, 2005||3–5 || align="left"| @ Carolina Hurricanes (2005–06) ||18–13–6 || 
|-

|- align="center" bgcolor="#FFBBBB"
|38||L||January 3, 2006||4–6 || align="left"|  Pittsburgh Penguins (2005–06) ||18–14–6 || 
|- align="center" bgcolor="#FFBBBB"
|39||L||January 5, 2006||4–5 || align="left"| @ New Jersey Devils (2005–06) ||18–15–6 || 
|- align="center" bgcolor="#CCFFCC" 
|40||W||January 7, 2006||4–1 || align="left"|  Ottawa Senators (2005–06) ||19–15–6 || 
|- align="center" bgcolor="#FFBBBB"
|41||L||January 11, 2006||1–2 || align="left"| @ Colorado Avalanche (2005–06) ||19–16–6 || 
|- align="center" bgcolor="#CCFFCC" 
|42||W||January 14, 2006||6–2 || align="left"|  San Jose Sharks (2005–06) ||20–16–6 || 
|- align="center" bgcolor="#CCFFCC" 
|43||W||January 16, 2006||4–2 || align="left"|  Dallas Stars (2005–06) ||21–16–6 || 
|- align="center" bgcolor="#FFBBBB"
|44||L||January 19, 2006||2–3 || align="left"| @ Calgary Flames (2005–06) ||21–17–6 || 
|- align="center" bgcolor="#FFBBBB"
|45||L||January 21, 2006||2–6 || align="left"| @ Vancouver Canucks (2005–06) ||21–18–6 || 
|- align="center" bgcolor="#FFBBBB"
|46||L||January 23, 2006||3–7 || align="left"| @ Carolina Hurricanes (2005–06) ||21–19–6 || 
|- align="center" bgcolor="#CCFFCC" 
|47||W||January 25, 2006||5–3 || align="left"| @ Philadelphia Flyers (2005–06) ||22–19–6 || 
|- align="center" bgcolor="#FFBBBB"
|48||L||January 26, 2006||0–3 || align="left"| @ Ottawa Senators (2005–06) ||22–20–6 || 
|- align="center" bgcolor="#CCFFCC" 
|49||W||January 28, 2006||4–3 OT|| align="left"| @ Toronto Maple Leafs (2005–06) ||23–20–6 || 
|- align="center" bgcolor="#FFBBBB"
|50||L||January 31, 2006||2–8 || align="left"|  Carolina Hurricanes (2005–06) ||23–21–6 || 
|-

|- align="center" bgcolor="#FFBBBB"
|51||L||February 2, 2006||1–3 || align="left"| @ Boston Bruins (2005–06) ||23–22–6 || 
|- align="center" bgcolor="#CCFFCC" 
|52||W||February 4, 2006||2–0 || align="left"|  Boston Bruins (2005–06) ||24–22–6 || 
|- align="center" bgcolor="#CCFFCC" 
|53||W||February 5, 2006||5–0 || align="left"|  Philadelphia Flyers (2005–06) ||25–22–6 || 
|- align="center" 
|54||L||February 7, 2006||2–3 OT|| align="left"|  Buffalo Sabres (2005–06) ||25–22–7 || 
|- align="center" bgcolor="#CCFFCC" 
|55||W||February 9, 2006||3–2 OT|| align="left"| @ Buffalo Sabres (2005–06) ||26–22–7 || 
|- align="center" 
|56||L||February 11, 2006||1–2 SO|| align="left"|  Atlanta Thrashers (2005–06) ||26–22–8 || 
|- align="center" bgcolor="#CCFFCC" 
|57||W||February 28, 2006||5–3 || align="left"| @ New York Islanders (2005–06) ||27–22–8 || 
|-

|- align="center" bgcolor="#CCFFCC" 
|58||W||March 2, 2006||1–0 || align="left"| @ Florida Panthers (2005–06) ||28–22–8 || 
|- align="center" bgcolor="#CCFFCC" 
|59||W||March 4, 2006||6–2 || align="left"| @ Tampa Bay Lightning (2005–06) ||29–22–8 || 
|- align="center" 
|60||L||March 6, 2006||4–5 SO|| align="left"| @ Philadelphia Flyers (2005–06) ||29–22–9 || 
|- align="center" bgcolor="#FFBBBB"
|61||L||March 7, 2006||3–5 || align="left"| @ Toronto Maple Leafs (2005–06) ||29–23–9 || 
|- align="center" bgcolor="#CCFFCC" 
|62||W||March 9, 2006||3–0 || align="left"| @ Boston Bruins (2005–06) ||30–23–9 || 
|- align="center" bgcolor="#CCFFCC" 
|63||W||March 11, 2006||1–0 || align="left"|  New York Rangers (2005–06) ||31–23–9 || 
|- align="center" bgcolor="#FFBBBB"
|64||L||March 13, 2006||1–2 || align="left"|  Tampa Bay Lightning (2005–06) ||31–24–9 || 
|- align="center" bgcolor="#FFBBBB"
|65||L||March 16, 2006||1–5 || align="left"|  Carolina Hurricanes (2005–06) ||31–25–9 || 
|- align="center" bgcolor="#FFBBBB"
|66||L||March 18, 2006||4–5 || align="left"|  Pittsburgh Penguins (2005–06) ||31–26–9 || 
|- align="center" bgcolor="#CCFFCC" 
|67||W||March 20, 2006||4–2 || align="left"| @ Washington Capitals (2005–06) ||32–26–9 || 
|- align="center" bgcolor="#FFBBBB"
|68||L||March 21, 2006||1–3 || align="left"| @ New York Islanders (2005–06) ||32–27–9 || 
|- align="center" bgcolor="#CCFFCC" 
|69||W||March 23, 2006||5–1 || align="left"|  Toronto Maple Leafs (2005–06) ||33–27–9 || 
|- align="center" bgcolor="#CCFFCC" 
|70||W||March 25, 2006||6–2 || align="left"|  Toronto Maple Leafs (2005–06) ||34–27–9 || 
|- align="center" bgcolor="#CCFFCC" 
|71||W||March 26, 2006||6–5 || align="left"| @ Pittsburgh Penguins (2005–06) ||35–27–9 || 
|- align="center" bgcolor="#CCFFCC" 
|72||W||March 28, 2006||2–0 || align="left"|  New York Islanders (2005–06) ||36–27–9 || 
|- align="center" bgcolor="#CCFFCC" 
|73||W||March 30, 2006||3–2 OT|| align="left"|  Washington Capitals (2005–06) ||37–27–9 || 
|-

|- align="center" bgcolor="#CCFFCC" 
|74||W||April 1, 2006||2–0 || align="left"|  Boston Bruins (2005–06) ||38–27–9 || 
|- align="center" bgcolor="#CCFFCC" 
|75||W||April 4, 2006||5–3 || align="left"|  Boston Bruins (2005–06) ||39–27–9 || 
|- align="center" bgcolor="#CCFFCC" 
|76||W||April 6, 2006||5–3 || align="left"| @ Ottawa Senators (2005–06) ||40–27–9 || 
|- align="center" bgcolor="#FFBBBB"
|77||L||April 8, 2006||2–3 || align="left"|  New Jersey Devils (2005–06) ||40–28–9 || 
|- align="center" bgcolor="#CCFFCC" 
|78||W||April 10, 2006||3–2 || align="left"|  Ottawa Senators (2005–06) ||41–28–9 || 
|- align="center" bgcolor="#FFBBBB"
|79||L||April 12, 2006||1–3 || align="left"| @ Buffalo Sabres (2005–06) ||41–29–9 || 
|- align="center" bgcolor="#CCFFCC" 
|80||W||April 13, 2006||4–3 || align="left"| @ Boston Bruins (2005–06) ||42–29–9 || 
|- align="center" bgcolor="#FFBBBB"
|81||L||April 15, 2006||2–4 || align="left"|  Buffalo Sabres (2005–06) ||42–30–9 || 
|- align="center" bgcolor="#FFBBBB"
|82||L||April 18, 2006||3–4 || align="left"|  New Jersey Devils (2005–06) ||42–31–9 || 
|-

|-
| Legend:

Playoffs

|- align="center" bgcolor="#CCFFCC" 
|1||W||April 22, 2006||6–1 || align="left"| @ Carolina Hurricanes || Canadiens lead 1–0 || 
|- align="center" bgcolor="#CCFFCC" 
|2||W||April 24, 2006||6–5 OT || align="left"| @ Carolina Hurricanes || Canadiens lead 2–0 || 
|- align="center" bgcolor="#FFBBBB" 
|3||L||April 26, 2006||1–2 OT || align="left"| Carolina Hurricanes || Canadiens lead 2–1 || 
|- align="center" bgcolor="#FFBBBB" 
|4||L||April 28, 2006||2–3 || align="left"| Carolina Hurricanes || Series tied 2–2 || 
|- align="center" bgcolor="#FFBBBB" 
|5||L||April 30, 2006||1–2 || align="left"| @ Carolina Hurricanes || Hurricanes lead 3–2 || 
|- align="center" bgcolor="#FFBBBB" 
|6||L||May 2, 2006||1–2 OT || align="left"| Carolina Hurricanes || Hurricanes win 4–2 || 
|-

|-
| Legend:

Player statistics

Scoring
 Position abbreviations: C = Centre; D = Defence; G = Goaltender; LW = Left Wing; RW = Right Wing
  = Joined team via a transaction (e.g., trade, waivers, signing) during the season. Stats reflect time with the Canadiens only.
  = Left team via a transaction (e.g., trade, waivers, release) during the season. Stats reflect time with the Canadiens only.

Goaltending
  = Joined team via a transaction (e.g., trade, waivers, signing) during the season. Stats reflect time with the Canadiens only.
  = Left team via a transaction (e.g., trade, waivers, release) during the season. Stats reflect time with the Canadiens only.

Awards and records

Awards

Transactions
The Canadiens were involved in the following transactions from February 17, 2005, the day after the 2004–05 NHL season was officially cancelled, through June 19, 2006, the day of the deciding game of the 2006 Stanley Cup Finals.

Trades

Players acquired

Players lost

Signings

Draft picks
Montreal's draft picks at the 2005 NHL Entry Draft held at the Westin Hotel in Ottawa, Ontario.

See also
 2005–06 NHL season

Notes

References

Montreal Canadiens seasons
Montreal Canadiens season, 2005–06
Montreal